TETS may refer to one of the following:
Tetramethylenedisulfotetramine
Trains Entering Terminal Stations, a train protection system
TETs, a transliteration of the Russian term for cogeneration power stations as seen in station names

See also
Tet (disambiguation)